The Little Minnesota River is a  headwaters tributary of the Minnesota River in northeastern South Dakota and west-central Minnesota in the United States.  Via the Minnesota River, it is part of the Mississippi River watershed.

Course
The Little Minnesota rises in Marshall County, South Dakota from the Coteau des Prairies near the town of Veblen and flows generally southeastward through Roberts County, where it collects two small tributaries, Standfast Creek and the Jorgenson River.  Near the Minnesota state line, it passes within a mile of Lake Traverse, part of the Hudson Bay watershed, from which it is separated by a low continental divide.  The river enters Minnesota at the town of Browns Valley and shortly enters Big Stone Lake, which is drained by the Minnesota River.  The region between Lake Traverse and Big Stone Lake is known as the Traverse Gap; it was formed by Glacial River Warren which drained Lake Agassiz (the lakebed of which is now the Red River Valley) toward the end of the last of the ice ages.

At Peever, SD, the river measures approximately 63 cubic feet per second.

See also
 List of rivers of Minnesota
 List of longest streams of Minnesota
 List of rivers of South Dakota

References

 Waters, Thomas F. (1977).  The Streams and Rivers of Minnesota.  Minneapolis: University of Minnesota Press.  .

Rivers of Minnesota
Rivers of South Dakota
Tributaries of the Minnesota River
Rivers of Big Stone County, Minnesota
Rivers of Marshall County, South Dakota
Rivers of Roberts County, South Dakota
Rivers of Traverse County, Minnesota